U.S. Customhouse and Post Office, also known as City Hall, is a historic customs house and post office located at Springfield, Greene County, Missouri. It was built in 1891, and is a three-story, "L"-shaped, Romanesque Revival style limestone block building.  An addition to the building was constructed in 1910–1914. It features a turret and campanile-like tower.

It was listed on the National Register of Historic Places in 1979.

References

Government buildings on the National Register of Historic Places in Missouri
Romanesque Revival architecture in Missouri
Government buildings completed in 1891
Buildings and structures in Springfield, Missouri
National Register of Historic Places in Greene County, Missouri
1891 establishments in Missouri